Maple Creek is a town in the Cypress Hills of southwest Saskatchewan, Canada. It is surrounded by the Rural Municipality of Maple Creek No. 111. The population was 2,084 at the 2016 Census.

Maple Creek runs along the west side of town.

History 

After the North-West Mounted Police had been established at Fort Walsh, settlers began to explore the Cypress Hills area, living along the creeks and doing small-scale ranching. The Department of the Interior was operating a First Nations farm on the Maple Creek, a few miles south from the present town site. In 1882-1883 the First Nations (mainly Cree, Saulteaux, and Assiniboine) were moved to Qu'Appelle, and the farm was then operated by Major Shurtleff, an ex-Mounted Policeman, and George Wood, his brother-in-law.

In the winter of 1882, a Canadian Pacific Railway construction crew of 12 decided to winter where the town of Maple Creek now stands. This marked the establishment of Maple Creek.

In June 2010, a flood submerged some of the town when Maple Creek overflowed its banks. The same flood hit much of southwestern Saskatchewan and southern Alberta and even destroyed a portion of the Trans-Canada Highway.

Heritage sites 
There are two designated municipal heritage Properties in Maple Creek:
The W. R. Orr Heritage Building was constructed in 1910 and over its history it has housed the Union Bank of Canada; W.R. Orr Law Office; Royal Bank of Canada; Bank of Montreal; Burnett & Orr Law Office.
The St. Mary's Anglican Church was constructed in 1909 in the Romanesque style. The church also contains a vestry, narthex, and octagonal belfry with steeple that was added in 1928.

Demographics

Climate

Maple Creek experiences a semi-arid climate (Köppen climate classification BSk). With the exception of southwestern Alberta, winters in Maple Creek are typically warmer than those in the adjacent plain region of southern Alberta and Saskatchewan, being a convergence point for Chinook winds originating along the Rocky Mountain Front. The mean maximum temperature in January 2006 was 5.3 °C  for the Maple Creek townsite, compared to 5.0 °C  for Calgary and 4.7 °C  for Medicine Hat.

Attractions
 Cypress Hills Interprovincial Park, an interprovincial park straddling the southern Alberta-Saskatchewan border, north-west of Robsart.
 Cypress Hills Vineyard & Winery
 Fort Walsh, a reconstructed North-West Mounted Police fort and part of the Cypress Hills Interprovincial Park. As a National Historic Site of Canada the area possesses national historical significance. It was established as a NWMP fort after and near the Cypress Hills Massacre.
 Grasslands National Park, represents the Prairie Grasslands natural region, protecting one of the nation's few remaining areas of undisturbed dry mixed-grass/shortgrass prairie grassland. The park is in the WWF-defined Northern short grasslands ecoregion, which spans across much of Southern Saskatchewan, Southern Alberta, and the northern Great Plains states in the USA. The unique landscape and harsh, semi-arid climate provide niches for several specially adapted plants and animals. The park and surrounding area house the country's only black-tailed prairie dog colonies. Other rare and endangered fauna in the park include the pronghorn, sage grouse, burrowing owl, ferruginous hawk, prairie rattlesnake, black-footed ferret and eastern short-horned lizard. Flora includes blue grama grass, needlegrass, Plains Cottonwood and silver sagebrush.
 Robsart Art Works, opens July 1 to August 28, 2010, from 1 to 4 p.m. and by appointment and features Saskatchewan artists featuring photographers of old buildings and towns throughout Saskatchewan.
 T.rex Discovery Centre, a facility to house the fossil record of the Eastend area started many years before the discovery of "Scotty" the T.Rex in 1994.

Education

The Sidney Street School and the Maple Creek Composite School serve the local community.

Great Plains College operates a satellite campus in Maple Creek.

Notable people
Stuart John Cameron, MLA for Regina South
Barry Dean, NHL player for the Philadelphia Flyers
Dickson Delorme, YouTuber (Quick Dick McDick), farmer, comedian
Gordon Poirier, NHL player for Montreal Canadiens
Zack Smith, NHL player for the Chicago Blackhawks

See also
 Maple Creek Airport
 List of communities in Saskatchewan
 List of towns in Saskatchewan

References

Towns in Saskatchewan
Division No. 4, Saskatchewan